Viengkeo Kay Bounkeua is an American politician who served as a member of the New Mexico House of Representatives for the 19th district from 2021 to 2023. She was selected by members of the Bernalillo County Commission to succeed Sheryl Williams Stapleton, who resigned from the House amid embezzlement charges.

Early life and education 
Bounkeua was raised in the Northeast Heights neighborhood of Albuquerque, New Mexico. Of Laotian Chinese descent, her parents immigrated to the United States from Laos via Thailand. She earned a Bachelor of Science degree in biological anthropology from the University of New Mexico and a Master of Public Health from the University of Michigan School of Public Health.

Career 
In 2011, Bounkeua joined the New Mexico Asian Family Center, working as director of programs and later as executive director. In April 2020, Bounkeua became the New Mexico deputy director of the Wilderness Society. She was selected to succeed Sheryl Williams Stapleton in the New Mexico House of Representatives by members of the Bernalillo County Commission in August 2021. Upon assuming office, Bounkeua became the first Asian-American woman to serve in the New Mexico Legislature.

References 

Asian-American people in New Mexico politics
Living people
People from Albuquerque, New Mexico
University of New Mexico alumni
University of Michigan School of Public Health alumni
Democratic Party members of the New Mexico House of Representatives
Women state legislators in New Mexico
American people of Laotian descent
Year of birth missing (living people)
21st-century American women
Laotian people of Chinese descent